José Gregorio Vielma Mora (born 26 October 1964, San Cristóbal, Táchira) was the former governor of the Venezuelan state of Táchira (2012-2017). He is a member of the United Socialist Party of Venezuela.

Election results

Sanctions

The Government of Canada sanctioned Vielma Mora in November 2017 as being someone who participated in "significant acts of corruption or who have been involved in serious violations of human rights".

The United States sanctioned Vielma Mora on 25 July 2019 for being involved in a corrupted food scheme with Colombian businessman Alex Saab. Saab used some of his profits from corrupt food contracts to pay bribes to government officials for the importation of food through Táchira, including to Vielma Mora, who was the governor at the time.

References

1964 births
Living people
Governors of Táchira
People from San Cristóbal, Táchira
United Socialist Party of Venezuela politicians
People of the Crisis in Venezuela
People of the 1992 Venezuelan coup d'état attempts
Recipients of Venezuelan presidential pardons
Members of the Venezuelan Constituent Assembly of 1999